The Last Tunnel is a 2004 Canadian crime drama film, directed by Érik Canuel. Based on the autobiography of convicted bank robber Marcel Talon, the film stars Michel Côté as a recently released prisoner reuniting his criminal colleagues to pull off one last heist. The cast also includes Jean Lapointe, Christopher Heyerdahl, Sébastien Huberdeau and Céline Bonnier.

Awards
The film garnered eight Genie Award nominations at the 25th Genie Awards:
Best Actor (Côté)
Best Supporting Actor (Lapointe)
Art Direction/Production Design (Jean Bécotte)
Cinematography (Bernard Couture)
Editing (Jean-François Bergeron)
Overall Sound (Dominique Chartrand, Gavin Fernandes and Pierre Paquet)
Sound Editing (Christian Rivest)
Achievement in Music: Original Score (Michel Corriveau)
It won the awards for Best Supporting Actor and Best Overall Sound.

References

External links 
 
 
 

2004 films
Canadian crime drama films
Films directed by Érik Canuel
French-language Canadian films
2000s Canadian films